The  is a Japanese funicular line in Takamatsu, Kagawa. The line does not have any official name. This is the only funicular line Shikoku Cable operates, while it also operates aerial tramways. The line opened in 1931 as a route to Yakuri-ji, the 85th temple of Shikoku Pilgrimage.

Basic data
Distance: 
Gauge:  
Stations: 2
Vertical interval:

See also
List of funicular railways
List of railway companies in Japan
List of railway lines in Japan

External links
 Shikoku Cable official website 

Funicular railways in Japan
Rail transport in Kagawa Prefecture
1067 mm gauge railways in Japan
Railway lines opened in 1931
1931 establishments in Japan